Togdheer is an administrative region (gobol) in central Somaliland. Togdheer is bordered by Maroodi Jeex to the west, Saaxil to the north, Sanaag to the northeast, Sool to the east and Ethiopia to the south. Its capital is Burao.

Overview
Togdheer is bordered by Maroodi Jeex from the west, Sahil to the north, Ethiopia to the south, and Sanaag & Sool to the east. With its capital at Burao (Burco), the region's name is derived from the Togdheer River, which means "Long River" in Somali. The region has an approximate population of 350,000 people.

Under British Somaliland, the Togdheer region was formerly the Burao district which was one of three districts that comprised the Burao region. The other two regions were Las Anod and Erigavo districts. Sanaag was carved out of Togdheer region and was established as a separate region on June 23, 1973, comprising the three districts of Erigavo, Las Qorey and Garadag.

As with much of Somaliland, most local residents in the Togdheer region are nomadic pastoralists.

Districts
The Togdheer region consists of the following three districts:

Demographics
It is inhabited by the Habr Yonis, Habr Je'lo, Arap and Issa Musse sub-divisions of Isaaq. The Dhulbahante of the Harti Darod clan is also present in the Buuhoodle district.

Major towns
Burao
Oodweyne
Buuhoodle
Balidhiig
Qoryale
Yirowe

Map

See also
Ogo Mountains
Hahi

References

External links
Administrative map of Togdheer
Togdheer News Network (in Somali)

 
Regions of Somaliland